Malkajgiri Lok Sabha constituency is one of the 17 Lok Sabha (lower house of the Indian Parliament) constituencies in the Indian state of Telangana. This constituency came into existence in 2008, following the implementation of delimitation of parliamentary constituencies based on the recommendations of the Delimitation Commission of India constituted in 2002.

As of 2019, Malkajgiri is the largest Lok Sabha constituency by number of electors with 3,150,303. It first held elections in 2009 as a constituency of the South Indian state of Andhra Pradesh and its first member of parliament (MP) was Sarvey Sathyanarayana of the Indian National Congress. The new state of Telangana was created in 2014 by the implementation of the Andhra Pradesh Reorganisation Act, 2014 and this constituency became part of it. From 2014-2019, its MP was Malla Reddy who represented the Telugu Desam Party at the election. In 2016, Malla Reddy switched parties to represent the Telangana Rashtra Samithi. The current MP of Malkajgiri is Revanth Reddy who represents the Indian National Congress.

Assembly segments
Malkajgiri Lok Sabha constituency comprises the following seven Legislative Assembly segments:

Members of Parliament

Election results

General election 2019

General election 2014

General election 2009

See also
 Rangareddy district
 Ladakh Lok Sabha constituency
 Lakshadweep Lok Sabha constituency
 List of Constituencies of the Lok Sabha

References

External links
 Malkajgiri lok sabha  constituency election 2019 date and schedule

Lok Sabha constituencies in Telangana
Ranga Reddy district